Darling, How Could You! is a 1951 American period comedy film directed by Mitchell Leisen and starring Joan Fontaine and John Lund. The script is based on the 1905 J. M. Barrie play Alice Sit-by-the-Fire. The film was directed by Mitchell Leisen.

Plot
In late 1906, brother and sister Cosmo and Amy Grey have not seen their parents for many years, their father being a doctor who has been in Panama during work on the Panama Canal. Their housekeeper sends them to see a play, Peter Pan, but by mistake they end up seeing a rather sophisticated family melodrama instead.

Robert and Alice Grey come home not sure what to expect. The children hardly know their parents at all. Baby Molly has formed a natural attachment to her nanny, and both are reluctant to have Alice come in and "take over". The three children warm to Robert readily, but Alice receives a cold welcome. Furthermore, the play has given Amy some peculiar ideas of how adults behave. When she hears Alice receive an invitation to meet family friend Dr. Steven Clark, she falsely assumes they are having a romantic tryst.

Amy shows up at Steve's unexpectedly, trying to talk him out of the "affair", much to his confusion. She then decides to hide in a closet when her parents arrive, but when a glove is found and Amy's presence revealed, everybody gets the wrong idea. Alice assumes the doctor is seeing her daughter, while Robert assumes the doctor is seeing his wife. Eventually, Alice discovers why Amy has believed she has been having an affair. She decides to follow the plot of the play and pretends to give Steve up in a dramatic fashion. This helps win Amy, and the other children, over to her side. She explains everything to Robert, much to his amusement, and the newly contented family sits by the fire.

Cast
 Joan Fontaine as Mrs. Alice Grey
 John Lund as Dr. Robert Grey
 Mona Freeman as Amy Grey
 Peter Hansen as Dr. Steven Clark
 David Stollery as Cosmo Grey
 Virginia Farmer as Fanny
 Angela Clarke as Nurse
 Lowell Gilmore as Aubrey Quayne
 Robert Barrat as	Mr. Rossiter
 Gertrude Michael	 as Mrs. Rossiter
 Mary Murphy as Sylvia
 Frank Elliott as	Simms
 Billie Bird as Rosie
 Willard Waterman as Theatre Manager

Reception 
In a contemporary review for The New York Times, critic Howard Thompson called the film "feeble, sticky and laboriously arch" and a "lusterless flapdoodle." Thompson wrote: "Ragged sentimentality and hackneyed misunderstanding march hand in hand through this tritely presented tale of parlor embarrassment. ... Paramount, how could you!"

References

External links
 

1951 films
Films directed by Mitchell Leisen
American black-and-white films
American historical comedy films
1950s historical comedy films
American films based on plays
Films set in 1906
Articles containing video clips
Films scored by Friedrich Hollaender
Films with screenplays by Lesser Samuels
Dodie Smith
Paramount Pictures films
1951 comedy films
1950s English-language films
1950s American films